Polyptychoides grayii, or Gray's polyptychus, is a moth of the family Sphingidae. It is known from eastern Africa, south to South Africa.

The wingspan is 77–93 mm.

The larvae feed on Cordia caffra.

References

Polyptychoides
Moths described in 1856
Moths of Africa